Khuduts (Dargwa: ХудуцI) is a rural locality (a selo) in Ashtynsky Selsoviet, Dakhadayevsky District, Republic of Dagestan, Russia. The population was 425 as of 2010. There are 3 streets.

Geography 
Khuduts is located 47 km southwest of Urkarakh (the district's administrative centre) by road, on the Ulluchay River. Ashty and Kunki are the nearest rural localities.

References 

Rural localities in Dakhadayevsky District